The Verse about the Book of the Dove (Голубиная книга, Golubinaya Kniga) is a medieval . At least 20 versions are known.  They vary in length from 30 to over 900 lines. The poem is generally thought to have been written ca. 1500 in the Novgorod region, though Russian nationalists postulate its great antiquity. The earliest extant manuscript is dated to the 17th century.

The main part of the Dove-Book is a long sequence of riddles. In a series of answers to those riddles, King David explains the origin of light, sun, moon, and social classes. He also mentions a mysterious stone "clept the Alatyr". Isabel Florence Hapgood describes the content of one version in the following terms:

The poem's folk cosmology and the title have been derived by Vladimir Toporov from the Bundahishn. The root "golub" (dove) in title "Golubinaya" is not about birds. It is believed to be derived from the root "glub" (depth, deep), which refers to depth of concepts described in the book. Also it could originate from "sefer torah": truncated "sefer tor" can be translated to Russian as "dove book".

Several major Russian poets and artists of the early 20th century (such as Nicholas Roerich and Andrey Bely) were inspired by the Dove-Book. The Russian Orthodox Church had it banned as a heretical mixture of apocryphal Christian tales with pagan lore.

References

External links 
 Two versions of the poem (in Russian)

Apocrypha
Christian poetry
Folk Christianity
15th-century Russian literature
Riddles